The  35th Virgin Islands Legislature is the current meeting of the Legislature of the Virgin Islands. It has convened in Charlotte Amalie on January 9, 2023, during the first two years of Governor Albert Bryan’s second term.

Major Legislation

Enacted
 January 18, 2023: Virgin Islands Cannabis Use Act
 January 20, 2023: Virgin Islands Behavioral Health Act + Bill No. 34-0238, requires public schools to include Virgin Islands and Caribbean history into the curriculum for K-12th. Bill No. 34-0211, prohibits extremely loud music in vehicles and places of entertainment as relates to noise pollution. + The Equality Act, 34-0271, makes it illegal to discriminate against a person’s sexual orientation or gender identity.
 January 23, 2023: Bill No. 35-0003, appropriates $2.2 million for funds for the adoption of various portions of the Virgin Islands Agricultural Plan.

Proposed (but not enacted)
 Bill No. 35-0013: provides undocumented immigrants in the territory with a restricted driver’s license and identification card.

Major resolutions
 Bill No. 0002 (Res.1901): Adopting the Rules of the 35th Legislature.

References

Virgin Islands Legislature
Politics of the United States Virgin Islands